99th Brigade may refer to:
 99th Composite Brigade (Bangladesh)
 99th Mountain Brigade, formerly 99th Indian Infantry Brigade (India)
 99th Brigade (Iraq)
 99th Mixed Brigade (Spain); see 
 99th Brigade (United Kingdom)